The 2022 Nigeria Women's Cup (known as the 2022 Aiteo Women's Cup for sponsorship reasons),  is the 28th edition of the Nigeria Women's Cup,  the main knockout tournament for women's football clubs in Nigeria. 

The tournament commenced on 26 July 2022 with the rookie stage. Bayelsa Queens are the defending champions.

Format
The tournament is a single elimination knockout tournament which sees 38 clubs from 21 states + the FCT compete for the trophy. The first involves 32 clubs, this includes 3 winners from the rookie stage

Rookie stage

|-
|colspan=3|26 July 2022
|-

|}

First round 

|-
|colspan=3|30 July 2022
|-

|-
|colspan=3|31 July 2022
|-

|-
|colspan=3|1 August 2022
|-

|}

References

2021–22 in Nigerian football
Women's cup